KKMK (93.9 FM, "93.9 The Mix") is a radio station in Rapid City, South Dakota, airing a hot adult contemporary format.

Ownership
In May 1999, Triad Broadcasting reached a deal to acquire this station from Brothers Jim and Tom Instad as part of a twelve-station deal valued at a reported $37.8 million.

In July 2006, Schurz Communications Inc. reached an agreement to buy this station from Triad Broadcasting Co. as part of a six-station deal valued at a reported $19 million. Schurz Communications created the Black Hills broadcast division, New Rushmore Radio, now known as Rushmore Media Company.

Schurz Communications announced on September 14, 2015 that it would exit broadcasting and sell its television and radio stations, including KKMK, to Gray Television for $442.5 million. Though Gray initially intended to keep Schurz' radio stations, on November 2, it announced that HomeSlice Media Group, LLC would acquire KKMK and the other Rushmore Media Company radio stations for $2.2 million; the deal reunites the stations with KBHB and KKLS, which HomeSlice acquired from Schurz in 2014 following its purchase of KOTA-TV. The sale to HomeSlice Media was consummated on February 15, 2016 at a price of $2.5 million.

References

External links
KKMK official site

KKMK
Hot adult contemporary radio stations in the United States
1971 establishments in South Dakota
Radio stations established in 1971